This list of Brigham Young University buildings catalogs the current and no-longer-existent structures of Brigham Young University (BYU), a private, coeducational research university owned by the Church of Jesus Christ of Latter-day Saints (LDS Church) located in Provo, Utah, United States. BYU's buildings exceed 300 in number and cover the university's  of property.

Academic facilities

Administrative buildings

Athletic and outdoor recreation facilities

Auxiliary buildings

Broadcasting buildings

Museums

Off-campus buildings

Observatory complex

The observatory complex is located near the south end of Utah Lake, west of Payson, Utah.

Off-campus student centers

Ranches and preserves

On-Campus Housing

Foreign Language Student Residence (FLSR)

Brigham Young University's Foreign Language Student Residence (FLSR) program was established in 1978 as a three-house off-campus residence center dedicated to the study of Russian and Italian. Due to the success of these houses, the program expanded from three houses to one specially-designed complex in 1991. Today the FLSR consists of five buildings- four outer buildings with three floors each. These contain all of the male and female apartments for the program. The central building has rooms used for student activities, dinners, and Sunday church meetings. The on-campus complex consists of 25 individual apartments for men and women learning eleven different languages (depending on demand): Hebrew, Chinese, French, German, Italian, Japanese, Portuguese, Russian, Korean, and Spanish. Residents of these apartments agree to speak only their apartment's assigned language during the school year while in the apartment. Students are accompanied by a native resident throughout the year to enhance the experience. The Foreign Language Student Residence houses between 130 and 150 students per semester.

Helaman Halls

Helaman Halls, named after one of the Book of Mormon heroes of the Church of Jesus Christ of Latter-day Saints, was first opened for use in the Fall of 1958. The initial on-campus complex consisted of five residence halls, a central dining building, and an administration building. Construction costs were $5,300,000, and when completed the complex initially housed 1170 male students. The residence buildings were named after prominent LDS individuals and/or families, including the Hinckley Family, Stephen L. Chipman, David John, Thomas N. Taylor, and Walter Stover. The dining building was christened the George Q. Cannon Building and at the time could accommodate 1,800 people. In addition, both a pool and a "recreation field" the latter of which included eight tennis courts four softball fields was completed for the use of residents. Two more residence buildings were already under construction when the completion of the original Helaman Halls Complex was announced on September 18, 1958. The two new buildings were opened for use in September 1959, and housed 234 women each, bringing the total occupancy number of the complex to 1638. In 1959, the semester rent for Helaman halls was approximately $23 per term. Another building, May Hall, was added in 1970, and a new men's hall, which has not been officially named but is referred to as "Building 9", was built between Merrill and May halls in 2010.

Notable individuals who lived at Helaman Halls include Mike Leach, Vai Sikahema, and Alema Harrington.

Today, Helaman Halls has a total of nine residence buildings with five buildings for women and four buildings for men. The Residence Halls are located on the northwest corner of campus. Living style consists of two people per room, with 22 rooms on each floor, with six floors (in three stories) per building. Helaman Halls currently has housing for just over 2,100 students.  The halls underwent a 12-year renovation spanning from 1991 through 2003. There are basic kitchen facilities in the basement lobby of each hall, but residents are required to purchase a meal plan. The majority of resident meals are eaten in the area central building- the Cannon Center. Because of its close proximity to the athletic facilities and all-you-can-eat dining, many Freshman athletes choose to live in Helaman Halls.

Heritage Halls

Heritage Halls were originally built in 1953. They were the oldest dorms on campus until they were torn down (see Previous Residential Facilities below) and replaced by the new Heritage Halls buildings. In order to make room for the new Heritage Halls buildings, the Deseret Towers "DT" apartment complex was also torn down from 2006 to 2008, and construction on the new buildings at the Heritage complex began in 2011.

Today, Heritage Halls is a complex of dorms that consists of 14 buildings, located on the East side of campus. In the summer of 2017, work was completed on a new central building and one additional dorm building, bringing the total capacity to about 2,750 students. Two additional dorm buildings are currently under construction.

The living arrangements in Heritage Halls are similar to those of an apartment. Students share a kitchen and a common area. Each of the L-shaped buildings houses about 210 students. They are 4 stories high and feature East Coast classic design. Activity rooms on each floor have pictures with Church history themes and have floor-to-ceiling windows that offer views of the surrounding area. The individual units feature full kitchens, bedrooms with individualized lighting systems, and hallway vanities.

The buildings in the Heritage Halls complex are as follows:

Wymount Terrace

Wymount Terrace is the family housing unit for married students and is located on the northeast side of campus. It consists of South Wymount (24 three-story apartment buildings) and North Wymount (48 two-story apartment buildings). The buildings are arranged in quadrangles that enclose lawn and playground areas. The complex started as a trailer park and was converted into apartment housing in the 1960s. The buildings in the Wymount Terrace complex include:

Wyview Park
In 1971, Brigham Young University purchased a group of 150 mobile home units and set them up on a tract of land between University Avenue
and 200 West from 1800 North to 2230 North to provide housing for married students. This project included 36 one-bedroom units, 78 two-bedroom units, and 36 three-bedroom units. This trailer park was demolished in 1997 to accommodate replacement married student apartments.

The current complex includes 30 buildings which originally housed married student families, until the end of the summer of 2006, when the southern half of the residential park was converted into housing for singles and eventually the entire complex.  In 2013 after the winter semester of school concluded, the northern portion of Wyview was converted into a makeshift Missionary Training Center (MTC) to help alleviate the overburdened Provo MTC just up the hill.  As part of this temporary MTC complex, the LDS church also obtained a lease for the Raintree Apartments across the street to the west and both facilities are used together to house missionaries and their training activities.

The buildings are arranged in quads with playgrounds and courts enclosed. The complex contains a laundromat, a convenience store, a BYU Creamery store, and a multipurpose building which houses the Wyview office and a chapel for LDS wards. The buildings in the Wyview Park complex include:

Physical plants

Police and traffic buildings
The BYU Police Department has its headquarters in the Jesse Knight Building (JKB), which also has many classrooms and other academic functions, so it is listed under academic buildings above. However the following are buildings completely devoted to police and traffic-control functions.

Service buildings ("B" buildings)

Storage buildings

Former buildings
Many structures that have been used by Brigham Young University in the past have either been sold or demolished. BYU had 354 buildings, 85 of which were designated temporary, in August 1971. Only 127 of those are listed in either the above portion of this list or in the list on BYU housing. The rest of the list attempts to cover buildings that have been razed or sold.

Starting in 1957 BYU purchased large amounts of land to fill out the planned area of the campus. This included the purchase of approximately 100 houses. About 50 of these had been razed by 1973 but the other 50 or so were used for various purposes by the university at that time. While some of these houses are reported in this or other lists, others are not.

Rented and limited-use buildings
These buildings have been used by Brigham Young University or Brigham Young Academy, but were never owned by the school.

Notes

 Blank cells indicate missing information
 "Abbr." = abbreviation; "Yr. Occ." = year occupied; "Yr. Vac." = year vacated

References

External links
 Interactive map of Brigham Young University

Lists of university and college buildings in the United States
List

Lists of university and college residences in the United States
Brigham Young University